Tanya Seaman was an American environmentalist and the co-founder and past executive director of PhillyCarShare. Seaman was born in Menlo Park, California to Lynn & Elisabeth Seaman.
Seaman died in March 2022 of metastatic breast cancer.

Environmentalism
On November 7, 2002, Seaman helped to launch PhillyCarShare a non-profit carsharing organization in Philadelphia, Pennsylvania. PhillyCarShare has been one of the most successful, fastest-growing carsharing programs. It is seen as a national model in both the environmental and non-profit sectors. Seaman helped develop the innovative program with the City of Philadelphia to use PhillyCarShare cars as fleet cars for city workers.

Her leadership made her one of the Philadelphia Business Journals "40 Under 40" to watch in the city of Philadelphia.

Background
Seaman held a degree in design from the University of California, Davis. After working in the field of architecture for several years, she left her home state of California to earn a Masters in City and Regional Planning at the University of Pennsylvania. Seaman attempted to live as sustainable a lifestyle as possible: she does not own a car and eats a plant-based diet.

References

External links

Philly mag

1967 births
American environmentalists
American women environmentalists
Living people
People from Menlo Park, California
University of California, Davis alumni
University of Pennsylvania School of Design alumni
Activists from California
21st-century American women